In cellular automata, the von Neumann neighborhood (or 4-neighborhood) is classically defined on a two-dimensional square lattice and is composed of a central cell and its four adjacent cells.  The neighborhood is named after John von Neumann, who used it to define the von Neumann cellular automaton and the von Neumann universal constructor within it.  It is one of the two most commonly used neighborhood types for two-dimensional cellular automata, the other one being the Moore neighborhood.

This neighbourhood can be used to define the notion of 4-connected pixels in computer graphics.

The von Neumann neighbourhood of a cell is the cell itself and the cells at a Manhattan distance of 1.

The concept can be extended to higher dimensions, for example forming a 6-cell octahedral neighborhood for a cubic cellular automaton in three dimensions.

Von Neumann neighborhood of range r 

An extension of the simple von Neumann neighborhood described above is to take the set of points at a Manhattan distance of r > 1. This results in a diamond-shaped region (shown for r = 2 in the illustration). These are called von Neumann neighborhoods of range or extent r. The number of cells in a d-dimensional von Neumann neighborhood of range r is the Delannoy number D(d,r). The number of cells on a surface of a d-dimensional von Neumann neighborhood of range r is the Zaitsev number .

See also 
 Moore neighborhood
 Neighbourhood (graph theory)
 Taxicab geometry
 Lattice graph
 Pixel connectivity
 Chain code

References

External links
 
 Tyler, Tim, The von Neumann neighborhood at cell-auto.com

Cellular automata